Crassispira hanleyi is a species of sea snail, a marine gastropod mollusk in the family Pseudomelatomidae.

Description
The length of the shell attains 10 mm

This subacuminate, black shell is known by the fine costae, continued nearly to the base and the infrasutural keel.

Distribution
This species occurs in the Pacific Ocean from Mazatlan, Mexico to Nicaragua

References

External links
 

hanleyi
Gastropods described in 1857